Anthony Joshua vs Alexander Povetkin was a heavyweight professional boxing match contested between undefeated and unified WBA (Super), IBF, WBO, and IBO champion Anthony Joshua, and former WBA (Regular) champion Alexander Povetkin. The bout took place on 22 September 2018 at the Wembley Stadium in London, England. Joshua defeated Povetkin, retaining his heavyweight titles via seventh-round technical knockout (TKO).

Background
Following Povetkin's twelve-round unanimous decision (UD) victory over Christian Hammer in December 2017, the WBA installed Povetkin as their mandatory challenger to Joshua's WBA (Super) title.

Joshua defeated Joseph Parker in March 2018 by UD to capture the WBO title, with Povetkin appearing on the undercard, defeating David Price via fifth-round knockout (KO). The following month, the WBA ordered Joshua to enter into negotiations for a fight with Povetkin within 30 days. During this time, Joshua's promoter, Eddie Hearn, was also attempting to negotiate an undisputed fight with WBC champion Deontay Wilder. After the WBA granted several extensions to their deadline in order to facilitate the negotiations with Wilder, they gave Joshua 24 hours on 26 June to provide a signed contract with Povetkin or risk being stripped of his WBA (Super) title. On 16 July, Joshua vs. Povetkin was officially announced to take place on 22 September at the Wembley Stadium in London.

The Fight
After a tentative start to the opening round which saw neither fighter land significant punches, Povetkin landed a three-punch combination ending with a left hook in the final seconds of the round, momentarily stunning Joshua and leaving the champion with a broken and bloodied nose. The action picked up in the second, with Povetkin landing hooks to the head and body at close range while Joshua, opting to fight at a distance to utilise his height and reach advantage, landed jabs and straight-right hands to the head and body. Povetkin suffered a cut above his right eye towards the end of the round. Rounds three through six saw much of the same; Povetkin finding success up close with hooks and Joshua with jabs and straight right hands at range. Povetkin suffered a cut above his left eye in round four. Halfway through the seventh round, Joshua landed a right hand which visibly stunned Povetkin. After several follow up punches, Joshua landed a left-hook right-hand combination, knocking Povetkin to the canvas. Povetkin rose to his feet before the referee's count of ten, only to be met by a flurry of punches while against the ropes, prompting referee Steve Gray to wave off the fight, at 1 minute and 59 seconds into the round, after which Povetkin stumbled and fell to the canvas for a second time. At the time of the stoppage, all three judges' had Joshua ahead on the scorecards at 59–55, and 58–56 twice.

Fight card

References

2018 in boxing
2018 in British sport
September 2018 sports events in the United Kingdom
2018 sports events in London
Events at Wembley Stadium
International sports competitions in London
World Boxing Association heavyweight championship matches
International Boxing Federation heavyweight championship matches
World Boxing Organization heavyweight championship matches
International Boxing Organization heavyweight championship matches
Pay-per-view boxing matches
Boxing matches involving Anthony Joshua